Phebalium elegans is a species of spreading shrub that is endemic to Western Australia. It has warty branchlets, wedge-shaped leaves and two to five white flowers arranged in umbels on the ends of branchlets.

Description
It has warty branchlets covered with silvery scales. Flowering occurs from July to September.

Taxonomy and naming
Phebalium elegans was first formally described in 1998 by Paul Wilson in the journal Nuytsia from specimens collected in the Fraser Range east of Norseman by Kenneth Newbey in 1980.

Distribution and habitat
Phebalium elegans grows on rocky hills from the Bremer Range to the Fraser Range.

Conservation status
This phebalium is classified as "not threatened" by the Western Australian Government Department of Parks and Wildlife.

References

elegans
Flora of Western Australia
Plants described in 1998
Taxa named by Paul G. Wilson